Lucie Zhang (born 27 October 2000) is a French actress. She received critical acclaim for her feature film debut Paris, 13th District (2021), which earned her César and Lumières Award nominations. She appeared on the UniFrance and Screen International list of rising French talents to watch.

Early life and education
Zhang was born in the 13th arrondissement of Paris to Chinese parents, her father from Yunnan and her mother from Henan, who met after individually moving to Paris. She has two younger siblings. The family moved out to the 16th arrondissement and opened a restaurant on Avenue de Versailles. She trained in acting at the Cours Florent and Francis Poulenc Municipal Conservatory. She is currently pursuing a degree in economic management at Paris Dauphine University.

Filmography

Awards and nominations

References

External links
 

Living people
2001 births
Actresses from Paris
French people of Chinese descent
Paris Dauphine University alumni